is a passenger railway station  located in the city of Minamiashigara, Kanagawa Prefecture, Japan, operated by the Izuhakone Railway.

Lines
Iwahara Station is served by the  Daiyūzan Line, and is located 6.0 kilometers from the line’s terminus at Odawara Station.

Station layout
The station consists of a single side platform with no station building. The station is unmanned.

Adjacent stations

History
Iwahara Station was officially opened on October 15, 1925.

Passenger statistics
In fiscal 2019, the station was used by an average of 746 passengers daily (boarding passengers only).

The passenger figures (boarding passengers only) for previous years are as shown below.

Surrounding area
Prefectural Road 74 runs on the west side of the station, and the Karikawa River on the east side. Minamiashigara City Iwahara Elementary School is about 300 meters south of the station, and Iwahara Castle ruins and Iwahara Hachiman Shrine are relatively close to each other about 1 km southwest of the station.

See also
List of railway stations in Japan

References

External links

Izuhakone Railway home page 

Railway stations in Japan opened in 1925
Izuhakone Daiyuzan Line
Railway stations in Kanagawa Prefecture
Minamiashigara, Kanagawa